Dzierżążno  (Cashubian Dzérzążno) is a village in the administrative district of Gmina Kartuzy, within Kartuzy County, Pomeranian Voivodeship, in northern Poland.

The village has a population of 1,314.

See also
 History of Pomerania

References

Villages in Kartuzy County